Marion Wyckoff Vanderhoef (December 6, 1894, New York – June 9, 1985) was a female tennis player from the United States who played in the first quarter of the 20th century.

Vanderhoef reached the quarterfinals of the U.S. National Championships in 1915 which she lost in straight sets to Martha Guthrie. In 1917 she achieved the best performance of her career by reaching the finals of the U.S. National Championships, that year renamed to National Patriotic Tennis Tournament, but was defeated by the Norwegian reigning champion Molla Mallory in three sets.

She married Harry Franklin Morse, a shipping and shipbuilding executive, on 6 April 1918 in New York.

Grand Slam finals

Singles (1 runner-up)

References

External links
 Personal archive auction

1894 births
1985 deaths
American female tennis players
Sportspeople from New York City
20th-century American women
Tennis people from New York (state)